Grand Ayatollah Sayyid Muhammad al-Shahroudi (Arabic: آيت الله العظمى سيد محمد حسينى شاهرودى) (December 1925 – 7 July 2019) was a senior Iraqi Twelver Shi'a Marja' in Iran.

He studied in seminars of Najaf and Qom under Grand Ayatollah Hashem Amoli, and Grand Ayatollahs Syed Jamaluddin Golpaygani, Sayyid Mahmoud Hussaini Shahroudi and Abdul Hussain Rashti.

Death
Mohammad Shahroudi died in Tehran, Iran at the age of 94.

See also
Grand Ayatollahs
List of Maraji

References

1925 births
2019 deaths
Iraqi ayatollahs
Iranian ayatollahs
People from Najaf
Iraqi Shia Muslims
Iraqi people of Iranian descent